KZ, K-Z, Kz, or kz may refer to:

Arts and media
 K-Z, a 1972 Italian documentary film
Kz (film), a 2006 documentary film
 Kuhns Zeitschrift, the former colloquial name for the linguistics journal Historische Sprachforschung

People
 KZ Okpala, American basketball player
 KZ Tandingan (born 1992), Filipino singer
 KZ, member of the Japanese music group Livetune

Places
 Ka'ba-ye Zartosht, or Kaabah of Zoroaster, a 5th-century BCE tower at Naqsh-e Rustam, an archaeological site in Iran
 Kazakhstan (ISO 3166 code: KZ)
 KidZania
 Konzentrationslager, the German term for Nazi concentration camps (1933–1945)

Transportation
 Nippon Cargo Airlines (IATA airline code: KZ)
 Kramme & Zeuthen, Danish aeroplane builders, see Skandinavisk Aero Industri
 Kuaizhou, a Chinese family of carrier rockets
 Toyota KZ engine, a diesel engine made for passenger cars

Other uses
 .kz, the Internet country code top-level domain for Kazakhstan
 Kz, the symbol for the Angolan kwanza, the currency of Angola
 kz (digraph), in Esperanto
 Korkine–Zolotarev lattice basis reduction algorithm
 Kolmogorov–Zurbenko filter
 KZ (Knowledge Zenith), a Chinese manufacturer of IEMs